Winfield Temple (November 4, 1875 – 1957) was an American lawyer and politician who served as Mayor of Marlborough, Massachusetts.

Notes

1875 births
1957 deaths
20th-century American lawyers
20th-century American politicians
Massachusetts lawyers
Mayors of Marlborough, Massachusetts